Jessica Marie Page Feldmark (born August 1, 1974) is a Democratic member of the Maryland House of Delegates.

Early life and career
Feldmark was born on August 1, 1974. She attended Goucher College, where she earned a B.A. degree in sociology and international relations, and American University, where she earned a M.S. degree in organization development. She moved to Columbia, Maryland in 1998 and was elected to the Wilde Lake Village Board in 2000. She resigned from the board in November 2002 to become a special assistant to Howard County councilman-elect Kenneth Ulman. Feldmark followed Ulman into the executive's office following his election in 2006, first serving as a senior advisor until 2009, when she became Ulman's Chief of Staff.

Following the election of Howard County executive Allan Kittleman in 2014, Feldmark was let go from her position to make room for Kittleman chief of staff Diane Wilson. A few hours after her departure, the Howard County Council announced that Feldmark would serve as the council's administrator, replacing Sheila Tolliver.

In February 2018, Feldmark filed to run for Maryland House of Delegates. She came in third place in the Democratic primary election, receiving 21.4 percent of the vote. Feldmark came in second place in the general election, receiving 21.9 percent of the vote.

In the legislature
Feldmark was sworn into the Maryland House of Delegates on January 9, 2019.

In January 2020, Feldmark filed to run as a convention delegate for Elizabeth Warren at the 2020 Democratic National Convention.

Committee assignments
 Member, Ways and Means Committee, 2019–present (election law subcommittee, 2019–present; revenues subcommittee, 2019–present)
 Joint Committee on Cybersecurity, Information Technology, and Biotechnology, 2019–present

Other memberships
 House Chair, Howard County Delegation, 2020–2021
 Member, Maryland Legislative Latino Caucus, 2019–present
 Maryland Legislative Transit Caucus, 2019–present
 Women Legislators of Maryland, 2019–present

Political opinions

Elections
Feldmark introduced legislation during the 2020 legislative session that would expand Maryland's public financing program to candidates other than the governor in statewide elections.

Feldmark introduced legislation during the 2021 legislative session that would introduce universal ballot marking devices and prevent ballots cast by voters with disabilities from being set apart from ballots cast by voters without disabilities. She also introduced legislation that would codify a temporary policy adopted by the Maryland State Board of Elections during the COVID-19 pandemic that would require local election boards to accept an absentee ballot and reject a provisional ballot if they received both from the same voter.

Government shutdown
Feldmark introduced legislation during the 2019 legislative session that would provide essential government employees to receive temporary assistance through the state during future government shutdowns. The bill passed and was signed into law by Governor Larry Hogan on March 26, 2019.

Social issues
In July 2020, Feldmark and 12 other state legislators signed onto a letter urging the Baltimore County Board of Education to ban the display of hate symbols, including the Confederate flag and swastikas, in schools across Baltimore County unless it is necessary for educational programming.

Taxes
Feldmark introduced legislation in the 2021 legislative session that would alter the state's Job Creation Tax Credit program by requiring that new positions that qualify for the credit pay a local prevailing wage of 150 percent of the state's minimum wage and provide career advancement opportunities, paid leave, and collective bargaining rights. The bill passed but was vetoed by Governor Hogan on May 28, 2021; the legislature voted to override Hogan's veto on the bill during its 2021 legislative session.

Electoral history

References

External links
 

Goucher College alumni
American University alumni
Living people
Democratic Party members of the Maryland House of Delegates
Place of birth missing (living people)
1974 births
21st-century American politicians
21st-century American women politicians
Women state legislators in Maryland